The 2012/13 FIS Freestyle Skiing World Cup was the thirty fourth World Cup season in freestyle skiing organised by International Ski Federation. The season started on 22 August 2012 and ended on 25 March 2013. This season included five disciplines: moguls, aerials, ski cross, halfpipe and slopestyle.

Men

Ski Cross

Moguls

Aerials

Halfpipe

Slopestyle

Ladies

Ski Cross

Moguls

Aerials

Halfpipe

Slopestyle

Men's standings

Overall 

Standings after 38 races.

Moguls 

Standings after 12 races.

Aerials 

Standings after 7 races.

Ski Cross 

Standings after 10 races.

Halfpipe 

Standings after 5 races.

Slopestyle 

Standings after 4 races.

Ladies' standings

Overall 

Standings after 38 races.

Moguls 

Standings after 12 races.

Aerials 

Standings after 7 races.

Ski Cross 

Standings after 10 races.

Halfpipe 

Standings after 5 races.

Slopestyle 

Standings after 4 races.

Nations Cup

Overall 

Standings after 76 races.

Men 

Standings after 38 races.

Ladies 

Standings after 38 races.

Footnotes

References

FIS Freestyle Skiing World Cup
World Cup
World Cup
Qualification events for the 2014 Winter Olympics
Freestyle